The Nieuport-Delage NiD 940 was a French, tailless, pusher configuration touring aircraft first flown in 1934. It suffered from longitudinal instabilities and despite modifications and a more powerful engine, it did not receive its Certificate of Airworthiness.

Design and development

The NiD 940 was a low cantilever wing aircraft. Its wing had a thick section and a chrome-steel tube structure and in plan was swept with straight-taper. Elevons, hinged at right angles to the line of flight, controlled both pitch and roll. Triangular wing tip fins, externally braced from tip to wing, provided yaw stability and carried generous, five-sided, angular rudders which could operate together for directional control but also be opened at right angles as air brakes. The wings could be folded for transport.

The fuselage of the NiD 940 was also a steel tube structure, flat-sided and short, not reaching the wing trailing edge. It was covered with tulipwood plywood overlain with fabric.  A well glazed cabin provided two side-by-side seats, with room for a third seat and baggage space behind them. The steel structure also mounted an  Lorraine 5Pc five-cylinder radial engine in uncowled pusher configuration. 

The NiD 940 had tricycle landing gear, with its mainwheels on V-struts hinged from the lower fuselage and with vertical shock absorber legs to the wings. Wingtips were protected by skids mounted on the bottom of the fins. The nosewheel was large and well forward.

In its initial form the prototype was known as the NiD 941. Though this was on display in November 1932 at the 13th Paris Salon de l'Aviation, it did not fly until February 1934, piloted by Nieuport's test pilot Joseph Sadi-Lecointe. The early trials showed a lack of longitudinal stability. Despite modifications and a new  Salmson 9Nc nine-cylinder radial engine, after which it became the NiD 942, an airworthiness certificate was not granted.

Variants
NiD 941 original aircraft with Lorraine 5Ps engine.
NiD 942 modified aircraft with Salmson 9Nc engine.

Specifications

References

Tailless aircraft
1930s French sport aircraft
 0940
Low-wing aircraft
Aircraft first flown in 1934